Admiral Sir John Walter Tarleton,  (8 November 1811 – 25 September 1880) was a Royal Navy officer who went on to be Second Naval Lord.

Naval career
Born the son of Thomas Tarleton of Bolesworth Castle and grandnephew of Sir Banastre Tarleton, Tarleton joined the Royal Navy in 1824. He played a key role in resolving a crisis in Burma in 1851 when the master of a British ship was illegally detained in Rangoon.

He was given command of the fifth-rate HMS Fox in 1852, of the frigate HMS Eurydice in 1855 and of the frigate HMS Euryalus in 1858: he led the latter ship as an element of the Channel Squadron and then of the Mediterranean Squadron. At this time Prince Alfred served as a cadet under him. Tarleton served as Junior Naval Lord from 1871 and then as Second Naval Lord from 1872 to 1874. He was promoted to Vice Admiral in 1875 and retired in 1879.

He died at his home in Warwick Square in London.

Family
In 1861 he married Finetta Esther Dinsdale; they went on to have one son and two daughters.

See also

References

|-

1811 births
1880 deaths
Royal Navy admirals
Knights Commander of the Order of the Bath
Lords of the Admiralty